Messaoud El Medioni, known as "Saoud l'Oranais" was born in 25 November 1886 in Oran. He was a reputed Jewish-Algerian band leader and proprietor of the original Café Oran. He was the uncle of French-Algerian pianist Maurice El Mediouni. 

Around 1938, the mother of a 13-year-old blind girl from Tiaret, Sultana Daoud, sent her to study with "Saoud l'Oranais" - this girl was later to become famous as Reinette L'Oranaise, the most prominent of all Jewish Algerian singers.

Medioni was arrested by the Germans in Marseille in January 1943 and sent to Sobibor extermination camp, where he was murdered in the gas chambers on 23 March 1943.

References

1943 deaths
Musicians from Oran
1886 births
Algerian Jews who died in the Holocaust
Algerian people who died in Sobibor extermination camp
People killed by gas chamber by Nazi Germany
Jewish musicians